is a Japanese rock band founded by Masahiro Naoe in 1983. During their heyday, they were dubbed "the Japanese XTC" due to their similar styles.

History 
Masahiro Naoe (then known as Masataro Naoe) formed the band  in 1981. In December 1983, the band was renamed "Carnation" and released their first independent single "Yoru no Entotsu" a year later. The band released their first full album Young Wise Men in 1988. Within the same year, the band left the independent scene and signed with Tokuma Japan. The band participated in the production of J-pop idol Chisato Moritaka's 1989 album Hijitsuryokuha Sengen, which features her cover of "Yoru no Entotsu". In addition, Moritaka provided guest vocals on the band's 1991 album Elec.King. Naoe continued to contribute to Moritaka's other releases throughout the first half of the 1990s.

The band signed with Nippon Columbia in 1994, with their album Edo River becoming popular with FM stations. They hosted a successful concert at Shibuya Public Hall in 1997. The band switched to Cutting Edge Records in 2003, but left two years later when Naoe formed his own label Hurricane Records.

In 2013, the tribute album  was released to celebrate Carnation's 30th anniversary. The album features contributions by Moritaka, Yasuyuki Okamura, and others. Three years later, Carnation signed with Nippon Crown. The band celebrated its 35th anniversary with their "Sunset Monsters" concert at the Hibiya Open-Air Concert Hall.

Members

Current members 
  – lead vocals, guitar (1983–present)
 Formerly known as 
  – bass, backing vocals (1992–present)

Former members 
  – drums, percussion (1985–2009)
  – keyboards, backing vocals (1987–2002)
  – guitar (1991–2002)
  – bass, backing vocals (1983–1991)
  – guitar, backing vocals (1984–1990)
  – drums, percussion (1983–1985)
  – saxophone
  – keyboards

Discography

Singles 
  (September 1984)
 "It's a Beautiful Day" (August 15, 1995)
  (January 20, 1996)
  (April 20, 1996)
 "Garden City Life" (July 20, 1996)
 "Superman" (October 10, 1996)
 "No Goodbye" (February 21, 1997)
 "New Morning" (September 20, 1997)
  (July 1, 1998)
  (January 30, 1999)
 "Real Man" (September 1, 1999)
  (January 21, 2000)
 "Angel" (May 13, 2004)
  (August 11, 2004)
  (July 6, 2005)
  (July 6, 2005)
 "Lady Lemonade" (July 6, 2005)
 "Wild Fantasy" (April 2007)
  (April 15, 2009)
  (December 26, 2014)

Albums 
 Duck Boat (February 21, 1986)
 Young Wise Men (March 25, 1988)
 Gong Show (August 25, 1988)
  (May 25, 1991)
  (August 25, 1992)
 Edo River (August 21, 1994)
 A Beautiful Day (August 19, 1995)
 Girl Friend Army (August 21, 1996)
 Booby (September 20, 1997)
 Parakeet & Ghost (February 10, 1999)
 Love Sculpture (February 19, 2000)
 Living/Loving (August 27, 2003)
 Super Zoo! (November 25, 2004)
 Wild Fantasy (July 26, 2006)
 Velvet Velvet (November 25, 2009)
 Sweet Romance (September 19, 2012)
 Multimodal Sentiment (July 13, 2016)
 Suburban Baroque (September 13, 2017)

Mini albums 
  (March 21, 1998)
 Venture Business Vol. 01 (October 16, 2002)
 Venture Business Vol. 02 (December 10, 2002)
 Venture Business Vol. 03 (March 11, 2003)
 Utopia (November 16, 2011)

Live albums 
 Wacky Packages (November 21, 1994)
 505 ~ Five Oh! Five ~ (April 10, 2002)
 Runnin' Wild Live (September 21, 2005)
 Carnation Wild Fantasy Tour 2006 (November 29, 2006)
 The Sounds of Rock Love (October 3, 2007)
 Carnation Billboard Live 2015 (Live Direct) "A Beautiful Day" 20th Anniversary Live (August 22, 2015)

Compilations 
 Mellow My Mind (July 29, 1987)
 Spy for the Band (Singles + More) (September 21, 2000)
 Carnation Is the Great R&R Band! ~C-Side of Carnation~ (August 25, 2004)
 The Very Best of Carnation "Long Time Traveller" (June 20, 2018)

Boxed sets 
 Early Years Box (April 17, 2013)

References

External links 
 
  (Nippon Columbia)
 
 

Japanese rock music groups
Japanese pop rock music groups
Musical groups from Tokyo
Musical groups established in 1983
Nippon Columbia artists